Dresdner Schnauzen is a German television series.

See also
List of German television series

External links
 

2007 German television series debuts
2007 German television series endings
Television series about animals
German-language television shows
ZDF original programming